Anna Monardo is an American novelist of the Italian-American experience.  Originally from Pittsburgh, she is a graduate of Saint Mary's College, Notre Dame, Indiana and received her M.F.A. from Columbia University in 1983. She is a professor of the Writer's Workshop at the University of Nebraska at Omaha.

Books

 The Courtyard of Dreams (Doubleday, 1993)
 Falling In Love with Natassia (Doubleday,  2006)

References

External links
 https://web.archive.org/web/20110707144158/http://www.annamonardo.com/index2.htm

20th-century American novelists
20th-century American women writers
21st-century American novelists
21st-century American women writers
American women novelists
American writers of Italian descent
Columbia University School of the Arts alumni
Eastern Washington University faculty
Hunter College faculty
Living people
Marymount Manhattan College faculty
New York University faculty
Saint Mary's College (Indiana) alumni
University of Nebraska Omaha faculty
1956 births
Novelists from Washington (state)
Novelists from New York (state)
Novelists from Vermont
American women academics